Marco Columbro (born 28 June 1950) is an Italian actor and television host.

Biography
Marco Columbro was born in Viareggio, Tuscany. He studied psychology at the University of Florence. Columbro worked as actor for numerous companies, collaborating, among the others, with Dario Fo. In 1981 he debuted for television as dubber of a puppet in Canale 5, Silvio Berlusconi's channel. Columbro subsequently hosted numerous shows in Berlusconi's channel, including Buona Domenica and Tra moglie e marito.

In 2003 he briefly worked for RAI, Italian's state television, for a show with Lorella Cuccarini. From 1993 onwards he worked mostly as actor for television series and for theatrical productions.

Filmography

External links
Official website

1950 births
Living people
People from Viareggio
Italian male actors
Italian television personalities
Converts to Buddhism
Italian Buddhists
University of Florence alumni